Phạm Lương Thanh Trúc (born on September 11, 1986; in Ho Chi Minh City) commonly known by her stage name Thanh Truc is a Vietnamese television and film actress and singer. She is a former member of the girl group J8687.

Songs
Một cơ hội – một tình yêu
Làm sao quên anh
Kiêu
Một lần thôi
Nước mắt trong tim
Giờ em đã biết
Mình đã xa nhau
Chỉ mình em còn nhớ
Anh cứ bỏ mặc em
Tại vì em nhớ anh

Filmography

Hướng nghiệp
Hướng nghiệp 2
Mộng phù du
Sóng đời
Mưa thủy tinh
Tình án
Hoa dại
Trái đắng
Tình khúc mùa thu
Chuyện tình mùa thu
Giấc mơ biển
Hạnh phúc muộn màng
Chàng trai không biết ghen
Mùi vị hạnh nhân
Bụi đời Chợ Lớn
Bóng tối rực rỡ
Những đóa ngọc lan
Sông trôi muôn hướng
Năm sau con lại về
Đặc vụ ở Macao
Lời nguyền lúc 0 giờ
Mối tình đầu
Điệp khúc tình
Chào buổi sáng, em yêu!
Ký ức tuổi thơ
Trà táo đỏ
Mẹ ghẻ
Tấm lòng của biển
Tình là dây oan
Đôi mắt bồ câu
Ngày tình lên ngôi
Ra giêng anh cưới em
Giông tố cuộc đời
Một thời lãng quên
Đoạn trường nam ai
Hot girl làm vợ
Một đời giông tố
Trần Trung kỳ án
Vợ ơi bồ nhé
Mãi mãi là bao lâu
Lật mặt hung thủ
Kẻ tàng hình
Nhật Ký nàng Xuân
Bí mật 69
Những nàng bầu hành động
Lời hẹn ước
Điều ước sao biển

References

External links
Thanh Trúc – Thành công nhờ sự kiên nhẫn
Diễn viên Thanh Trúc: Tôi từng rất tự ti về nhan sắc!

1986 births
Living people
Vietnamese film actresses
Vietnamese television actresses
21st-century Vietnamese women singers
People from Ho Chi Minh City